Presbitero Jose Velasco Jr. (born August 8, 1948) is the incumbent Governor of Marinduque and was a former Associate Justice of the Supreme Court of the Philippines. He was appointed to the Supreme Court by President Gloria Macapagal Arroyo on March 31, 2006.

Profile 

Born on August 8, 1948 in Pasay, Justice Presbitero J. Velasco Jr. is a product of the public school system. He went to J. Sumulong Elementary School (First Honorable Mention) and the University of the Philippines (UP) Preparatory School, respectively, for elementary and high school.

He obtained his Bachelor of Arts degree in Political Science from UP finishing the course in only three years. He went on to take up his Bachelor of Laws from the same university. At the UP College of Law, Justice Velasco was a member of the Order of the Purple Feather Honor Society and served on the Editorial Board of the Philippine Law Journal. He graduated eighth in the Class of 1971. He placed sixth in the 1971 Philippine Bar Examination with a bar rating of 89.85%.

He engaged in private law practice for 20 years before joining the public sector as a regular member of the JBC in 1993.

Justice Velasco also served as Undersecretary of the Department of Justice from 1995 to April 1998. He was concurrently Commissioner of the Housing and Land Use Regulatory Board. He was also Chairman of the Board of Pardons and Parole, Commissioner of the Commission on Settlement of Land Disputes, and Member of the Committee on Privatization.

In 1998, he was appointed Court of Appeals Justice. He was ranked eighth in disposition of cases when he was named Court Administrator in 2003.

Justice Velasco has also served the Integrated Bar of the Philippines (IBP) in several capacities: as its National President in 1987, as Commissioner of the IBP Committee on Bar Discipline, and as Honorary Chairman and Past National Co-Chairman of the IBP National Committee on Legal Aid.

He was awarded Most Outstanding Jurist by the Consumers Union of the Philippines in 2000.

In 2018, he filed his candidacy for Governor of Marinduque for the 2019 elections in which he won ending the rule of the Reyes which has ruled Marinduque for almost two decades

Justice Velasco is married to Lorna Quinto-Velasco with whom he has three children: Vincent Michael, Lord Allan Jay, and Tricia Nicole. Tricia (Ateneo Law School, Juris Doctor program) passed the 2008 Philippine Bar Examination.

Some notable opinions 
 Manotoc v. Court of Appeals (2006) — on requisites for valid service of summons
 Spouses Algura v. LGU of the City of Naga (2006) — on exemption of indigents from filing fees
 Republic of the Philippines v. SC Chief Justice Sereno (2018) — concurring and dissenting opinion on the Quo warranto petition against Maria Lourdes Sereno

References

External links 
 Justice Presbitero J. Velasco Jr. (Official Supreme Court Webpage)

Associate Justices of the Supreme Court of the Philippines
1948 births
Living people
20th-century Filipino judges
People from Pasay
People from Marinduque
Governors of Marinduque
University of the Philippines alumni
Ramos administration personnel
Justices of the Court of Appeals of the Philippines
21st-century Filipino judges